Dieppe 1942 is a Canadian television documentary film, directed by Terence Macartney-Filgate and broadcast on CBC Television in 1979. An examination of Canada's role in the Dieppe Raid of World War II, the film was written by Timothy Findley and William Whitehead.

The three-hour film was broadcast in two 90-minute parts on November 11 and 12, 1979.

The film received seven Genie Award nominations at the 1st Genie Awards in 1980, for Outstanding Documentary - 30 Minutes and Over, Direction in a Non-Feature Documentary (Macartney-Filgate), Non-Dramatic Script (Findley, Whitehead), Cinematography in a Non-Feature Documentary (Charles Stewart), Sound in a Non-Feature (Alex Taylor, Michael Lax and Austin Grimaldi), Editing in a Non-Feature (Thomas Berner) and Musical Score in a Non-Feature (Rick Wilkins). It did not win any of the awards.

References

External links

1979 television films
1979 films
English-language Canadian films
Canadian documentary television films
Works by Timothy Findley
1970s English-language films
1970s Canadian films